Yoon Bok-in ( born on 16 December 1970) is a South Korean actress. She made her acting debut in 1990 in theater, since then, she has appeared in number of plays, films and television series. She got recognition for her supporting roles in Suspicious Partner (2017), Train (2020), and Hello, Me! (2021). She has acted in films such as: Crossing (2008) and Rosebud (2019) among others.

Career
Yoon Bok-in is affiliated to artist management company Star Weave Entertainment since February 2022, which has acquired Entertainment O, to which she was originally affiliated.

On August 15, 2018 Yoon participated as a narrator in the 2018 Korean National Choir Festival creative cantata 'Song in the Wilderness' held at the Seoul Arts Center.

In 2020, Yoon appeared in OCN's TV series Train, a fantasy thriller set in parallel universes.

In 2021, she was cast in KBS fantasy rom-com Hello, Me! and tvN's crime drama Vincenzo portraying mother of the protagonists.

In 2022, she is seen in MBC's daily drama The Secret House portraying mother of the main lead.

Filmography

Films

Television series

Theater

Web series

References

External links
 
 
 Yoon Bok-in on Daum 
 Yoon Bok-in on Play DB
 Yoon Bok-in on KMDb 

21st-century South Korean actresses
South Korean film actresses
South Korean television actresses
South Korean stage actresses
Living people
1970 births